Illusion (Persian: توهم) is the second studio album by the Iranian rapper and singer-songwriter, Shahin Najafi as a solo artist after leaving Tapesh 2012. It was officially released on 19 September 2009 by the German-Iranian Pamas-Verlag publishing house.

Three days prior to the official release of the album, Najafi placed "Vaghti Khoda Khabeh" on his personal blog for free download. He also released a digital version of the entire album on 10 October for Iranian residing inside Iran to download at no cost.

Track listing
 "When God is Rage"
 "The Voice of the Woman"
 "The Last Time"
 "My Hasan"
 "Hamoon..."
 "Everything is a Lie"
 "On Our Side"
 "Sarina"
 "Now That Human"
 "I am a Suffering"

References

2009 albums
Shahin Najafi albums